Robert Batkowski (born 16 May 1978) is an Austrian luger who has competed since 1998. A natural track luger, he won three medals at the FIL World Luge Natural Track Championships with two golds (Men's singles: 2003, Mixed team: 2005) and one silver (Men's singles: 2011).

Batkowski earned three medals in the men's single events at the FIL European Luge Natural Track Championships with one gold (2008) and two silvers (1999, 2002).

References
FIL-Luge profile
Natural track European Championships results 1970-2006.
Natural track World Championships results: 1979-2007

External links

 

1978 births
Living people
Austrian male lugers
Austrian sportsmen